Ángel Fernández Artime (born August 21, 1960), is a Roman Catholic Priest of the Salesians of Don Bosco, who was elected by the Salesian General Chapter 27 as the Rector Major of the Salesians on May 24, 2014. With his election, he became the 10th successor of Don Bosco and the first Spaniard and third non-Italian to become Rector in Salesian history. He was also Provincial Superior of León, Spain, Southern Argentina and was preparing to take possession of Sevilla Province when he was elected Rector.

Life 

Ángel Fernández Artime was born in Gozón-Luanco, Asturias, in 1960 to a fishing family. In 1970 his family moved to Astudillo, Palencia where he enrolled in boarding school. Three years after he entered the Salesian School of León, he joined the Salesian Order, doing his first religious profession at 18. In 1987 he was ordained a priest at 26 in that same city.

Fernández holds a bachelor in Pastoral Theology, Philosophy and Pedagogy of the University of Valladolid.

Following his ordination, he began his ministry as teacher of religion at the Santo Angel Salesian College of Avilés (Asturias) and was also director at the Salesian College of Ourense.

Career 

As a member of the Salesian Province of León, Fernandez was member of the Provincial Council and Vice-Provincial. Between 2000 and 2006 he was Superior of that Province. He was selected to team with the organizers of the 26th General Chapter in Rome in 2008. In 2009 he was elected as Provincial for the Argentina South with headquarters in Buenos Aires. After his designation for a new position as Provincial in Sevilla, Spain, he was elected by the General Council as the new Rector Major. Fernandez worked with Cardinal Jorge Mario Bergoglio in Buenos Aires, who later became Pope Francis. As the new superior of his Order, he presided at the opening of the world celebrations of the 200th birthday of Saint John Bosco on January 24, 2014 in Turin.

Notes

Salesians of Don Bosco
1960 births
20th-century Spanish Roman Catholic priests
People from Asturias
Living people